Eugenio Nasarre Goicoechea (born 2 March 1946) is a Spanish politician.

Born in Madrid, he was Director General of RTVE in 1982. Nasarre then served in the Congress of Deputies between 2000 and 2015. He represented Madrid for two terms, and was elected to one term each by voters in Jaén and Granada.

His son has cerebral palsy.

References

1946 births
Living people
Members of the 7th Congress of Deputies (Spain)
People's Party (Spain) politicians
Members of the 8th Congress of Deputies (Spain)
Members of the 9th Congress of Deputies (Spain)
Members of the 10th Congress of Deputies (Spain)